Fritz Girr (born 3 October 1963) is a German sailor. He competed in the Star event at the 1988 Summer Olympics.

References

External links
 

1963 births
Living people
German male sailors (sport)
Olympic sailors of West Germany
Sailors at the 1988 Summer Olympics – Star
Sportspeople from Augsburg